Ennomosia basalis is a moth in the family Crambidae. It was described by George Hampson in 1897. It is found on the Antilles, where it has been recorded from Barbados.

References

Moths described in 1897
Pyraustinae